Homa is an ethnic group of Sudan. This ethnic group speaks Arabic. This group is not uniform in terms of religion.

Ethnic groups in Sudan